After their win in 1956, Switzerland continued with their format of a national final to select their entry for the 1957 contest.

Before Eurovision

National final 
The final was held on 11 February 1957 in St. Moritz. Three artists competed to represent Switzerland: last year's winner Lys Assia; Jo Roland, who participated at the national final of 1956; and Gianni Ferraresi, and the winning song was chosen by the votes of 4 regional juries. The winner was Lys Assia for the second year, with the song "".

The winning title was written by Émile Gardaz and composed by Géo Voumard, the same duo who wrote the previous year's Swiss entry and Eurovision winner "".

At Eurovision 
At the Eurovision Song Contest 1957 in Frankfurt, the Swiss entry was the last of the night following Denmark with "". At the close of voting, Switzerland had received five points in total; the country finished shared eight among the ten participants. The Switzerland jury gave seven points, to the winning country, the Netherlands.

The Swiss entry was conducted at the contest by the musical director Willy Berking.

Voting 
Every country had a jury of ten people. Every jury member could give one point to his or her favourite song.

References

External links
Swiss National Final page

1957
Countries in the Eurovision Song Contest 1957
Eurovision